O-Town is the debut studio album released by American boy band O-Town. It was released on January 23, 2001, in the United States by J Records, Trans Continental Records, and BMG.

Background
The album was first released on January 23, 2001, in the United States. It contained a total of twelve tracks. Around this time, the album was also released in Japan, with two bonus remixes exclusively for the market. In March 2001, the band were asked into the studio to record a song for the Dr. Dolittle 2 soundtrack. The track, "We Fit Together", featured on the soundtrack, released in June 2001. Following the release of the single "All or Nothing", the album was released in Europe and the United Kingdom on August 6, 2001, complete with "We Fit Together" as a bonus track, bringing the number of tracks to thirteen. As "We Fit Together" was not included on the original American version of the album, American fans were treated to a "Special Fan Edition" of the album on May 28, 2002. The fan edition was also made available in Germany.

Singles
"Liquid Dreams" was released as the album's lead single and became a top ten hit on the US Billboard Hot 100. It was followed by "All or Nothing", "We Fit Together" and "Love Should Be A Crime". "All or Nothing" peaked at number three on the US Adult Contemporary chart, while "We Fit Together" stalled at numner 4 on the Billboard Bubbling Under Hot 100 Singles chart. "Love Should Be a Crime" was not featured on any Billboard charts at all, although it made it to the top 40 in the UK, becoming the lowest-charting single from the album.

Critical reception

O-Town received mixed-to-negative reviews from critics. AllMusic editor Michael Gallucci rated the album one and a half stars out of five and wrote: "On their flaccid self-titled debut, the fivesome go through the motions directed to them by a squad of industry moneymakers. To say there isn't an ounce of sincerity to be found within the 12 songs here is pretty much taken for granted. That the entire project whiffs of cynicism is inexcusable." Chicago Tribune critic Allison Stewart found that "O-Town, while not uniquely horrible, is certainly the worst of the recent spate of boy band offerings. It's filled with moony, harmony-heavy songs that (the occasional R&B track aside) bear the unfortunate imprint of soft rock. It's enough to make one long for the Backstreet Boys, who, for all their faults, would have considered something like the chowderheaded "Sexiest Woman Alive" beneath their dignity. Entertainment Weeklys Davdi Browne felt that "the songs are mildly tuneful at times."

Commercial performance 
In the United States, O-Town debuted at number five on the US Billboard 200, selling over 150,000 copies in the first week. Just one month after it released, the album was certified platinum by the Recording Industry Association of America (RIAA). It also was a commercial success across Europe and North America, debuting in the top 10 of Canada, Iceland and the United Kingdom. O-Town eventually hit 1,700,000 copies, and over 3 million worldwide, becoming the band's most successful album.

Track listing

Notes
 signifies a vocal producer
 signifies an associate vocal producer

Charts

Weekly charts

Year-end charts

Certifications

References

2001 debut albums
J Records albums
O-Town albums
Albums produced by Warryn Campbell